Rhectogonia sandrae is a species of moth of the family Tortricidae first described by Józef Razowski in 2013. It is found on Seram in Indonesia. The habitat consists of lower montane forests.

The wingspan is about 16.5 mm. The forewings are yellowish ferruginous, with browner strigulation (fine streaks). The dorsum is suffused with rust brown and the markings are darker than the dorsal suffusion. The hindwings are brownish grey tinged with rust at the apex.

Etymology
The species is named for Sandra Doyle, a volunteer at the Natural History Museum in London.

References

Moths described in 2013
Olethreutini